The New Wood River is the name of a tributary of the Wisconsin River in Lincoln County, Wisconsin. The Ojibwe called the river Oskakirajaw Sebe. The river flows through the New Wood Wildlife Area, a recreational area open to public hunting managed by the Wisconsin Department of Natural Resources.

See also
List of rivers in Wisconsin

References

Rivers of Lincoln County, Wisconsin
Rivers of Wisconsin